James Whitney Wilkin (March 19, 1762 in Wallkill, then Orange County, now Ulster County, New York – February 23, 1845 in Goshen, Orange Co., NY) was an American lawyer and politician from New York.

Life
Wilkin served in the Revolutionary War.

He graduated from Princeton College in 1785. Then he studied law, and was admitted to the bar in 1788, and began practice in Goshen, New York. He was a member of the New York State Assembly in 1796, 1808 and 1808–09, and served as Speaker during the latter term. He entered the State militia and rose through successive grades to the rank of major general. He was a member of the New York State Senate from 1801 to 1804 and from 1811 to 1814. He was a member of the Council of Appointment in 1802, 1811, and 1813. He was an unsuccessful candidate for U.S. Senator from New York in 1813.

Wilkin was elected as a Democratic-Republican to the 14th United States Congress to fill the vacancy caused by the resignation of Jonathan Fisk. He took his seat on December 4, 1815. He was re-elected to the 15th United States Congress, and served until March 3, 1819. That year, his grandson, Alexander Wilkin, was born.

He was County Clerk of Orange County from 1819 to 1821, and County Treasurer for several years.

He was buried at Slate Hill Cemetery.

Sources

James Whitney Wilkin in Princetonians, 1784-1790: A Biographical Dictionary, by Ruth L. Woodward, Wesley Frank Craven

1762 births
1845 deaths
Princeton University alumni
Speakers of the New York State Assembly
New York (state) state senators
People from Wallkill, Orange County, New York
American militia generals
Democratic-Republican Party members of the United States House of Representatives from New York (state)